The Wa Technical University (formally Wa Polytechnic) is a public tertiary institution in the Upper West Region of Ghana.

Program run are: 
Pharmacy technology / dispensing technology
Agricultural engineering
Mechanical engineering
Building technology / estate management
Industrial arts
Civil engineering
Information communication technology
Accountancy
Banking and finance
Purchasing and supply

Graduation 
The university held its first ever university graduation on the 14th of November 2020.

Vice Chancellors 

 Vice Chancellor, Prof Baba Insah - 2020 to present

References

Polytechnics in Ghana
Wa, Ghana